Joshua Beckman is an American poet.

Life
Joshua Beckman was born in 1971 New Haven, Connecticut, and graduated from Hampshire College.

He is the author of eight collections of poetry, including The Inside of an Apple (which was a finalist for the Los Angeles Times Book Award), Take It, Shake, and Things Are Happening, which won the first annual Honickman-APR book award. He has collaborated with Matthew Rohrer on live improvised poems, collected in the book Nice Hat. Thanks and the audio CD Adventures While Preaching the Gospel of Beauty (which was recorded while on a 25-city tour). As part of their collaboration Beckman and Rohrer also performed an improvised walking tour of the Brooklyn Museum and a class on eavesdropping for the Museum of Modern Art.  

Beckman is an editor at Wave Books and has translated numerous works of poetry and prose, including Poker by Tomaž Šalamun, which was a finalist for the PEN America Poetry in Translation Award, as well as multiple co-translations with Alejandro de Acosta.

Beckman is also the recipient of numerous other awards, including a NYFA fellowship and a Pushcart Prize.

A graduate of Hampshire College in Amherst, Massachusetts, he was the editor of the short-lived literary magazine, Object Lesson, which served as inspiration for subsequent literary and artistic publishing ventures.

He lives in Seattle and New York.

Wave Books Poetry Bus Tour 2006
Beckman was the tour coordinator of the Poetry Bus Tour, a literary event sponsored by Wave Books in 2006. It featured a tour of contemporary poets, traveling by a 40-foot biodiesel bus, who stopped to perform in 50 North American cities over the course of 50 days.

Bibliography
The Inside of an Apple
Micrograms (Wave Books, 2011; co-translated with Alejandro de Acosta)
5 Meters of Poems by Carlos Oquendo de Amat (Ugly Duckling Presse, 2010; co-translated with Alejandro de Acosta)
Take It, Wave Books, 2009,  
Shake
Your Time Has Come, Verse Press, 2004,  
Poker by Tomaž Šalamun (translated by Joshua Beckman) (Ugly Duckling Presse, 2004)
Nice Hat. Thanks. Verse Press, 2002, ; (with Matthew Rohrer) 
Something I Expected To Be Different, Verse Press, 2001,  
Things Are Happening Copper Canyon Press, 1998,

Discography
Adventures While Preaching the Gospel of Beauty (2003) - with Matthew Rohrer

References

External links
Joshua Beckman's author page at Wave Books
Poetry Bus Tour 2006
"From Town to Town They Go, A Busload of Poets, Rhymes in Tow", The New York Sun

American male poets
American poets
Hampshire College alumni
Living people
Year of birth missing (living people)